Megachile setosa is a species of bee in the family Megachilidae. It was described by Vachal in 1909.

References

Setosa
Insects described in 1909